Naming is a procedure in some Westminster parliaments that provides for the speaker to temporarily remove a member of parliament who is breaking the rules of conduct of the legislature. Historically, "naming" refers to the speaker's invocation of the process by calling out the actual name of the member, deliberately breaking the convention of calling on members by the name of their constituency.

Processes to name a member are present in the lower houses of the British, Australian, Canadian, and New Zealand parliaments, and the legislatures of some Australian states and Canadian provinces. The implementation of the procedure varies by parliament, but usually requires the speaker to name a member, and then await another member to move that the offending member be disciplined according to the appropriate rules of order.

Process 

In the British House of Commons, the Speaker or one of his or her deputies can initiate the process by proposing a vote on the suspension of a member of the House if the speaker believes that the member has broken the rules of conduct of the House. Usually this is only done if the member has already been ordered to leave the House (which automatically leads to suspension for the remainder of that day) and refused to do so, or has committed a serious breach of conduct, and carries a suspension of up to five days and the loss of the member's salary during that period.

The procedure to name members is under Standing Order 44. Members can be suspended for the remainder of the day under Standing Order 43 (previously numbered as Standing Order 42). The Speaker or Deputy Speaker declares "I name", followed by the name of the member; and invites the Leader of the House or their deputy to move the motion that the member be removed, and then puts the question:

A division is not normally required since MPs will usually back the speaker's judgement. However, when John McDonnell was named by deputy speaker Alan Haselhurst on 15 January 2009 for disturbing the mace, a division was called because George Galloway and other members declared themselves with the Noes. A vote on the suspension was not held as no MPs were willing to act as tellers for the Noes.

In the Australian House of Representatives, the procedure to name members is under Standing Order 94. Under Standing Order 94a, the Speaker can order the immediate removal of a member for one hour, which is not open to a division. If a member is named under Standing Order 94b, the removal is dependent on a vote. If a member is named, the Speaker declares, "I name", followed by the Electoral Division of the member, and then the Leader of the House moves the question:

If the vote passes by a simple majority, then the member is required to leave the house for 24 hours.

In the House of Commons of Canada, the Speaker's authority to remove members is listed under Standing Order 11. A member named by the Speaker is required to leave the House immediately and prohibited from returning for the remainder of the day's sitting. Alternatively, the Speaker may suggest to the House the removal of a member for a specific period of time, which requires a motion to receive a majority vote on the House floor. Although the removal of members was increasingly common through the 20th century, usage of the procedure has since declined, having only been used four times since 2000. The order to remove a member generally requires an act of defiance against the Speaker, as the removal of a member is usually justified by the generic reasoning that the member is "disregarding the authority of the Chair".

The procedure has also been used once in the Massachusetts Senate. On October 27, 1981, Senate President William M. Bulger named Senator Alan Sisitsky after Sisitsky continuously disrupted the Senate proceedings. Sisitsky was then removed from the Senate Chamber by a court officer. The matter was referred to the Senate Ethics Committee, which recommended that Sisitsky be suspended indefinitely until he issued a formal apology to the Senate.

Lists of namings

House of Commons (United Kingdom)

Canada

House of Commons

Senate

Australia

House of Representatives 
This list contains instances that a member has been named during Questions without notice in the Australian House of Representatives.

New Zealand

House of Representatives

Legislative Council

Massachusetts General Court

House of Representatives

Senate

See also 
 Suspension from the UK parliament
 List of incidents of grave disorder in the British House of Commons

Notes and references

Parliament of the United Kingdom
Parliamentary procedure